Rajendra Keshavlal Shah (28 January 1913 – 2 January 2010) was a lyrical poet who wrote in Gujarati. Born in Kapadvanj, he authored more than 20 collections of poems and songs, mainly on the themes of the beauty of nature, and about the everyday lives of indigenous peoples and fisherfolk communities. In his poems using Sanskrit metrics, he was influenced by Rabindranath Tagore. He is considered one of the giants of post Gandhi-era in Gujarati literature.

Among his various professions, Shah was also a publisher in Mumbai, where he launched the poetry magazine Kavilok in 1957. The press itself became an important Sunday meeting-place for Gujarati poets. Apart from writing poetry, Shah also translated into Gujarati Tagore's poetry collection Balaaka; Jayadeva's Gita Govinda; Coleridge's The Rime of the Ancient Mariner; and Dante's The Divine Comedy.

Shah won the Jnanpith Award for 2001.

Biography
Shah was born in 1913 in Kapadvanj, a town in the erstwhile Bombay Presidency of British India (in present-day Kheda district of Gujarat, India). After attending Wilson College in Mumbai, he graduated with a degree in philosophy from the Maharaja Sayajirao University of Baroda. Shah's first poem came in print in Wilsonian, the college magazine of the Wilson College, in 1933.

In 1930, he discontinued from the study, as he was arrested in Civil disobedience movement and sentenced to the jail. In 1931, he married Manjula Agrawal.
Later, in 1934, he earned his bachelor's degree in philosophy from The Maharaja Sayajirao University of Baroda, and thereafter, started his career by teaching school students in Ahmedabad.

He died on 2 January 2010 in Mumbai.

Bibliography

Poetry collections 

 Dhvani (1951)
 Andolan (1952)
 Shruti (1957)
 Morpinchh (1959)
 Shant Kolahal (1962)
 Chitrana (1967)
 Kshan je Chirantan (1968)
 Vishadne Saad (1968)
 Madhyama (1978)
 Ikshana (1979)
 Udgiti (1979)
 Patralekha (1981)
 Prasang Saptak (1982)
 Dwasupama (1983)
 Panch Parva (1983)
 Vibhavan (1983)
 Chandan Bhini and Anamik (1987)
 Aranyak (1992)
 Smritisamvedana (1998)
 Virahmadhuri (1999)
 Vrajvaikunthe (2002)
 Ha... Hu Sakshi Chhu''' (2003)
 Premno Paryay (2004)
 Aa Gagan (2005)

 Awards 

He won Kumar Chandrak in 1947, Ranjitram Suvarna Chandrak in 1956.
He received Sahitya Akademi Award (1963) for his book Shant Kolahal''. He is also a recipient of Aurobindo Suvarna Chandrak presented (1980) by Gujarati Sahitya Parishad, Sahitya Gaurav Puraskar (1992) and Narsinh Mehta Award (1999). He received Jnanpith Award, considered to be India's highest literary award, in 2001.  The judges noted, "his intensity of emotion and innovation in form and expression which set him apart as a poet of great significance. The mystical tone of his poetry stems from the tradition of great medieval masters like Narsinh Mehta, Kabir and Akho."

References

External links
 

1913 births
2010 deaths
Gujarati-language writers
Gujarati-language poets
Maharaja Sayajirao University of Baroda alumni
20th-century Indian translators
Indian editors
Writers from Gujarat
20th-century Indian poets
Recipients of the Jnanpith Award
Indian independence activists from Gujarat
Recipients of the Ranjitram Suvarna Chandrak
Recipients of the Sahitya Akademi Award in Gujarati